The following is a list of poisonous animals, which are animals that passively deliver toxins (called poison) to their victims upon contact such as through inhalation, absorption through the skin, or after being ingested. They are often distinguished from venomous animals, which actively inject their toxins (called venom) into their victims through a venom apparatus such as fangs or a stinger. The only difference between poisonous animals and venomous animals is how they deliver the toxins. This list deals exclusively with poisonous animals.

Poisonous animals
This list is a partial list of animals that are poisonous to humans and other animals in that their flesh is toxic if consumed, or in some cases if they are touched:

Birds
Pitohui
Blue-capped ifrit
Shrikethrushes
Spur-winged goose (diet-dependent)
Common quail (diet-dependent)

Snakes
Rhabdophis keelback snakes
Garter snake (diet-dependent, when feeding on Pacific newts)

Frogs and toads
American toad
Asiatic toad
Cane toad
Colorado River toad
Common toad
Corroboree frog
European green toad
Fowler's toad
Mantella
Poison dart frog

Salamanders

Pacific newts or Western newts

Fish
Tetraodontidae (Blowfish, Pufferfish)
Greenland shark
Barracuda (age and diet dependent)

Cephalopods
Blue-ringed octopus
Pfeffer's flamboyant cuttlefish

Insects 
 Blister beetle
 Diamphidia
 Cinnabar moth
 Certain tiger moths (Erebidae)
 Birdwings
 Milkweed butterflies (include Monarch butterfly)
 Battus (butterfly)

Cnidarians 
 Some members of the genus Palythoa produce the highly toxic palytoxin
 Rhodactis species

See also 
 Poisonous amphibians
 Toxic birds
 List of venomous animals
 List of poisonous plants
 List of poisonous fungi

References 

Poisonous animals
 List of